Uncommon Threads is a TV craft show on the DIY Network, hosted by Allison Whitlock. The series focuses on the art of needlecrafts, including appliqué, crochet, embroidery, patchwork, quilting and rug making. The host is joined on each show by a different needle arts group, club, or designer from around the United States. Viewers get to know the guests as they share their ideas, specialties, techniques and creations.

Textile arts